Canale Monterano is a comune (municipality), former bishopric and Latin titular see in the Metropolitan City of Rome, in the central Italian region of Lazio (Ancient Latium).

Main sights

 Giardini Botanici di Stigliano
 Ruins of the former village of Monterano, which was set on fire, together with its population, by the French Republican army at the end of the 18th century. It included the church of San Bonaventura and a Baroque fountain with a lion statue, both designed by Gian Lorenzo Bernini.
 Remains of Roman aqueduct
Natural reserve of Monterano
Hermitage of Montevirginio

References

External links 
 Official website

Cities and towns in Lazio